Litueche Airport ,  is an airport serving Litueche, a city in the O'Higgins Region  of Chile. The runway is adjacent to the northeast side of the city.

See also

Transport in Chile
List of airports in Chile

References

External links
OpenStreetMap - Litueche
OurAirports - Litueche
SkyVector - Litueche

Airports in Chile
Airports in O'Higgins Region